Achirus is a genus of American soles native to tropical and subtropical parts of the Americas. They are mainly found in coastal areas, including salt and brackish water, but some species are found in fresh water.

Species

The currently recognized species in this genus are:
 Achirus achirus (Linnaeus, 1758) (drab sole)
 Achirus declivis Chabanaud, 1940 (plainfin sole)
 Achirus klunzingeri (Steindachner, 1880) (brown sole)
 Achirus lineatus (Linnaeus, 1758) (lined sole)
 Achirus mazatlanus (Steindachner, 1869) (Mazatlan sole)
 Achirus mucuri R. T. C. Ramos, T. P. A. Ramos & P. R. D. Lopes, 2009 (American sole)
 Achirus novoae Cervigón, 1982
 Achirus scutum (Günther, 1862) (network sole)
 Achirus zebrinus H. W. Clark, 1936

References

Achiridae
Ray-finned fish genera
Taxa named by Bernard Germain de Lacépède